Newark Town Hall is a municipal building consisting of a town hall, assembly rooms and a market hall in Newark on Trent, Nottinghamshire, England. It is a Grade I listed building.

History

The first municipal building in the town was a medieval building on the north side of the Market Place known as the "King's Hall", so named because of a transaction in 1547 when the Bishop of Lincoln exchanged ownership of the town with the Crown. The King's Hall was replaced, on the same site, by the "Moot Hall" in 1708: this was a structure with arcading on the ground floor to allow markets to be held; an assembly room was established on the first floor where the court of the manor of Newark met. The coat of arms of the Duke of Newcastle, who was lord of the manor, was affixed to the building.

In the early 1770s, Newark Corporation decided to commission a more substantial municipal structure. The new building was designed by John Carr in the neoclassical style and erected on the west side of the Market Place between 1774 and 1776. Much of the exterior building work must have been finished by 1775 as in early 1775 the commissioners for building the town hall were offering contracts for the interior joinery and plasterwork. 

The design involved a symmetrical main frontage with seven bays facing onto the Market Place; the central section of three bays, which slightly projected forward, featured a giant tetrastyle portico with Doric order columns supporting a pediment with the borough coat of arms in the tympanum and a statue of justice at its apex. There was a statue of a lion on the left of the pediment at a statue of a unicorn on the right. 

In the late 18th century an addition was made to form the mayor's secretary's office. The building served as the offices for the mayor and the local council since it was erected. The civic rooms include a council chamber and the mayor's parlour. The main assembly room, which has also been used as a ballroom and concert hall, was designed to also serve as the borough law court. The ceiling in the assembly room was installed by Moses Kilminster of Derby. 

The building continued to serve as the headquarters of the local borough council for much of the 20th century but ceased to be the local seat of government when the enlarged Newark and Sherwood District Council was formed at Kelham Hall in 1974. The town hall was restored between 1989 and 1991 by Guy St John Taylor Associates and James Brotherhood Associates. In 1993 the restoration work received a Europa Nostra Diploma of Merit. The building was opened up for public access as an art gallery and museum in 1999. In 2017 the exterior of the building was restored by historic building consultants Powell Williams at a cost of £600,000.

Notes

References

Grade I listed buildings in Nottinghamshire
City and town halls in Nottinghamshire
Government buildings completed in 1776
Newark-on-Trent
Assembly rooms